The Chapel of the Snows is a non-denominational Christian church located at the United States' McMurdo Station on Ross Island, Antarctica and is one of eight churches on Antarctica.

Overview
The chapel is the second southernmost religious building in the world and has regular Catholic and Protestant services. During the Austral Summer, the chapel is staffed by rotational chaplains. The Diocese of Christchurch supplies Catholic priests and the U.S. Air National Guard supplies Protestant chaplains. The chapel is also host to services and meetings for other faith groups such as Latter Day Saints, Baháʼí, and Buddhism and non-religious groups such as Alcoholics Anonymous. These meetings are dependent on lay leadership to be the points of contact and facilitators. The building itself may hold up to 63 worshippers.  

The original Chapel of the Snows burned down in 1978 and was replaced with a new temporary chapel. After the current chapel was built, the makeshift building (which has since burned down as well) was converted to other uses. The current chapel, dedicated in 1989, features custom stained glass which depicts the Antarctica Continent, the Erebus Chalice (during Austral summers only), and memorabilia from the US Navy's historic involvement in Operation Deep Freeze. The altar of the Chapel of the Snows is believed to come from St Saviour's Chapel in Lyttelton, New Zealand, where Robert Falcon Scott worshiped prior to embarking on the ill-fated Terra Nova Expedition.

The chapel is one of the buildings which will be replaced as part of the Antarctic Infrastructure Modernization for Science project, to upgrade and improve facilities at McMurdo.

In popular culture
 Antarctica: A Year on Ice

See also
Religion in Antarctica

References

External links
 

Chapels in Antarctica
McMurdo Station
Buildings and structures demolished in 1978
1956 establishments in Antarctica